The Bistra Mărului is a left tributary of the river Bistra in Romania. It discharges into the Bistra in Oțelu Roșu.

Tributaries
The following rivers are tributaries to the river Bistra Mărului:

Left: Varing, Frâncu, Dalciu, Jdimir, Șucu, Scorila, Bratonia, Șasa, Pietroasa
Right: Izvorul Alb, Peceneaga, Valea Rea, Valea Roșiei, Valea Mare, Sălătruc, Bolvașnița Mare

References

Rivers of Romania
Rivers of Caraș-Severin County